Alex Marzano-Lesnevich is an American author and former lawyer.

Biography 
Marzano-Lesnevich received their B.A. from Columbia University, M.F.A. from Emerson College, and J.D. from Harvard Law School.

Marzano-Lesnevich is the author of The Fact of a Body: A Murder and a Memoir, which received the 2018 Lambda Literary Award for Lesbian Memoir or Biography, the 2018 Chautauqua Prize, the 2019 Grand prix des lectrices de Elle in nonfiction, and was optioned by HBO to develop into a limited series. The novel recounts the story of Marzano-Lesnevich being assigned to defend a pedophile and child murderer in Louisiana who killed and likely molested a six-year-old boy in 1992, and had their faith against the death penalty shaken after watching the man's videotaped  confession.

Marzano-Lesnevich is currently a professor at Bowdoin College. They write extensively about transgender issues.

References 

Living people
Columbia College (New York) alumni
Emerson College alumni
Harvard Law School alumni
Lambda Literary Award winners
Bowdoin College faculty
American LGBT novelists
Transgender non-binary people
Year of birth missing (living people)
American non-binary writers